The Euskomedia Fundazioa is a foundation established in 2002 by the Society of Basque Studies. Its principal objective is the provision of cultural and scientific material " that could be of use for people interested in Basque society and culture."

In 2008, in association with Society of Basque Studies, the Euskomedia foundation published an internet version of Joanes Leizarraga's translation of the New Testament into the Basque language.

References

2002 establishments in Spain
Basque language